The 1969 Major League Baseball season was contested from April 7 to October 16, 1969. It included the third Major League Baseball expansion of the decade, with the Kansas City Royals, Montreal Expos, San Diego Padres, and Seattle Pilots each beginning play this season. The season was also celebrated as the 100th anniversary of professional baseball, honoring the first professional touring baseball team, the Cincinnati Red Stockings of 1869.

This year saw the adoption of rule changes to counteract the dominance of pitching in recent seasons. The mound was lowered and the strike zone adjusted. This was also the first season of the "Divisional Era". With each league expanding from 10 teams to 12 teams, both leagues were divided into two six-team divisions. Teams continued to play 162-game schedules, in place since 1962, by now playing the other five teams in their own division 18 times each (90 games) and playing the six teams in their league's other division 12 times each (72 games). The winners of each division would advance to the postseason and face each other in a League Championship Series, then a best-of-five series, to determine the pennant winners that would face each other in the World Series.

The Baltimore Orioles won the AL East with an MLB-best 109–53 record, and then defeated the AL West champion Minnesota Twins in three games in the first American League Championship Series. The New York Mets won the NL East division with an NL-best 100–62 record, and then defeated the NL West champion Atlanta Braves in three games in the first National League Championship Series. The "Miracle Mets", having joined the league in 1962, were the first expansion team to win a pennant.

The upstart Mets went on to upset the heavily favored Orioles in the World Series, four games to one, in what is considered one of the greatest upsets in World Series history.

Rules changes
In an effort to counteract a trend of low-scoring games and pitching ruling overall, Major League Baseball adopted two measures during the Baseball Winter Meetings held in December 1968. The strike zone was reduced to the area over home plate between the armpits and the top of the knees of a batter. Also, the height of the pitching mound was reduced from 15 inches to 10 inches, and it was recommended that the slope be gradual and uniform in every park.

A save became an official MLB statistic to reward relief pitchers who preserve a lead while finishing a game.

Expansion
MLB called for a four-team expansion to take place in 1971 at the 1967 Winter Meetings, the first expansion since 1962. However, there was a complication: influential U.S. Senator Stuart Symington of Missouri was irate over the American League's approval of Kansas City Athletics owner Charles O. Finley's arrangement to move his team to Oakland, California, for the 1968 season. This happened even though Finley had just signed a deal to play at Municipal Stadium at AL president Joe Cronin's behest, and Jackson County, Missouri, had just issued public bonds to build a stadium, the future Royals Stadium (now Kauffman Stadium), which would be completed in 1973.

Symington drew up legislation to remove baseball's anti-trust exemption, and threatened to pursue its passage if Kansas City did not get a new team. The Leagues agreed and moved expansion up to 1969, with the AL putting one of its new franchises in Kansas City. Ewing Kauffman won the bidding for that franchise, naming it the Kansas City Royals, after the local American Royal livestock show. The other AL team was awarded to Seattle. A consortium led by Dewey Soriano and William Daley won the bidding for the Seattle franchise, and named it the Seattle Pilots, a salute to the harbor pilots of the Puget Sound maritime industry and to the city's place in the aviation industry.

In the NL, one franchise was awarded to San Diego, California; the other to Montreal, Quebec, resulting in the first MLB franchise outside the United States. C. Arnholdt Smith, former owner of the AAA Pacific Coast League's San Diego Padres, won the bidding for the San Diego franchise, and the new San Diego MLB team inherited the Padres moniker.  Charles Bronfman, owner of Seagram, won the bidding for the Montreal franchise, naming them the Expos, in honor of the World's Fair that year. This was the last NL expansion until the 1993 season, and the last expansion for MLB overall until 1977.

Division play
As part of the 1969 expansion, each league was to be split into two divisions of six teams each, with each league holding a best-of-five League Championship Series to decide the pennant. The AL was divided purely along geographic lines, but when it came to assign divisions in the NL, the Chicago Cubs and St. Louis Cardinals insisted on being placed in the same division with the New York Mets and Philadelphia Phillies, on the basis that a schedule with more games with eastern teams would create a more lucrative schedule. Thus, Atlanta and Cincinnati were placed in the NL West. This alignment also addressed concerns that putting the league's three strongest clubs at the time—St. Louis, San Francisco, and the Cubs—in the west would result in divisional inequity.

The Padres and Expos each finished with 110 losses and at the bottom of their respective divisions. The Royals did better, finishing 69–93 and in fourth in the AL West, ahead of the Chicago White Sox. Even though the Pilots managed to avoid losing 100 games (they finished 64–98, last in the AL West), financial trouble would lead to a battle for team control, ending with bankruptcy and the sale of the team to Bud Selig and its move to Milwaukee, Wisconsin, as the Milwaukee Brewers for the 1970 season. The legal fallout of the battle would lead eventually to another round of expansion for the AL in the 1977 season, with Seattle getting a new team called the Mariners.

Logo
A special silhouetted batter logo, still in use by the league today, was created by Jerry Dior to commemorate the anniversary. It has served as inspiration for logos for other sports leagues in the United States—most notably the National Basketball Association, which used the silhouette of Jerry West to create their current logo, unveiled after the 1968–69 season.

Spring training boycott

After the 1968 season, the Major League Baseball Players' Association and the owners had concluded the first collective bargaining agreement in major league history. However, one point remained unresolved: the owners refused to increase their contribution to the players' pension plan commensurately with revenues from television broadcasts, which were increasing as more and more fans watched games that way. With the two sides at an impasse, at the beginning of the year the union called on players to refuse to sign contracts until the issue was resolved. Many did, including stars like Brooks Robinson.

The owners did not change their position, so the players' union called for members to boycott spring training the following month if the issue had not been resolved by then. After the union rejected the owners' offer of a higher yet still fixed contribution on February 17, the day before spring training was to begin, 400 players refused to report. The owners expected the situation to resolve itself soon in their favor, since they usually lost money on training camps while the players were foregoing their pay in the meantime.

The players remained united, and few changed their minds about the boycott as it progressed. After the first week only 11 of those who initially boycotted had reported; at the time many had off-season jobs which they continued to work at, and those who did report were in many cases not certain of their futures with their teams. Meanwhile, the owners were being pressured by the television broadcasters, who would also lose money without games to broadcast, or if teams played games with largely unknown rookies—one NBC executive said his company "would not pay major league prices for minor league games".

After that first week, new commissioner Bowie Kuhn leaned on the owners to reach an agreement as well, and they soon sat down with the players again. By February 25 they had acceded to most of the players' demands: a higher contribution of approximately $5.45 million annually, an earlier age at which players could begin drawing pensions, a wider range of benefits and less playing time required for eligibility. By the end of the month, all players had reported to spring training.

MLB statistical leaders

Regular season recap
The pennant races in the American League lacked drama. In the east, the Baltimore Orioles won 109 games and won the division by a whopping 19 games over the defending world champion Detroit Tigers. The surprise team was the "new" Washington Senators. Under new manager Ted Williams, they went 86–76; it was their first winning season since joining the league in 1961.  The Western Division race was a little closer, but the Minnesota Twins led most of the season and were never really threatened in winning the division by 9 games over the Oakland Athletics (who were the only other west team to finish over .500).
The National League, on the other hand, was very dramatic. The Chicago Cubs won 35 of their first 50 games, and on August 16, they led the New York Mets and St. Louis Cardinals by 9 games. But the Mets proceeded to win 37 of their last 48 games while the Cubs went 20–28 in the same time period and the Mets won the division by 8 games.
In the West, with 3 weeks to play in the season, 5 teams were all within 2 games of each other. The Houston Astros were the first to drop out of the race, losing 8 of 10. With two weeks to play, the San Francisco Giants led the Los Angeles Dodgers and Atlanta Braves by ½ game while the Cincinnati Reds were 2 games back. The Dodgers then lost 8 in a row and 10 of 11 to fall to 4th place. The Braves then went on a 10-game winning streak, ultimately clinching the division over the Giants on the next to last day of the season with a 3–2 win over the Reds. For the Giants, it was the 5th year in a row they would finish in 2nd place.

Awards
Baseball Hall of Fame
 Roy Campanella
 Stan Coveleski
 Waite Hoyt
 Stan Musial

American League
 Most Valuable Player – Harmon Killebrew, Minnesota Twins
 Cy Young Award – Denny McLain, Detroit Tigers and Mike Cuellar, Baltimore Orioles
 Rookie of the Year – Lou Piniella, Kansas City Royals

National League
 Most Valuable Player – Willie McCovey, San Francisco Giants
 Cy Young Award – Tom Seaver, New York Mets
 Rookie of the Year – Ted Sizemore, Los Angeles Dodgers

Gold Glove Award
 Joe Pepitone (1B) (AL) 
 Davey Johnson (2B) (AL) 
 Brooks Robinson (3B) (AL) 
 Mark Belanger (SS) (AL) 
 Paul Blair (OF) (AL) 
 Mickey Stanley (OF) (AL) 
 Carl Yastrzemski (OF) (AL)
 Bill Freehan (C) (AL) 
 Jim Kaat (P) (AL)

Standings

American League

National League

Postseason

Bracket

Home Field Attendance

See also

1969 in baseball
1969 Nippon Professional Baseball season
1969 in the United States

References

External links
1969 Major League Baseball season schedule at Baseball Reference

 
Major League Baseball seasons